Sunde is a village in Kvinnherad municipality in Vestland county, Norway.  The village is located along the Hardangerfjorden, just north of the island of Halsnøya.  The northern entrance to the Halsnøy Tunnel is located in Sunde.  The large urban village of Husnes lies just to the north of Sunde, on the other end of the lake Onarheimsvatnet.

The village of Sunde is grouped together with the neighboring village of Valen (to the east) by Statistics Norway which calls it the Sunde/Valen "urban area".

References

Villages in Vestland
Kvinnherad